Juan Manuel García Zavala (born 18 February 1980 in Guadalajara, Jalisco) is a Mexican football manager and former player.

External links
 
 Juan Manuel García Zavala at Sub17.LigaMX.net

1980 births
Living people
Mexican footballers
Atlas F.C. footballers
Club León footballers
Correcaminos UAT footballers
Leones Negros UdeG footballers
C.D. Veracruz footballers
Liga MX players
Ascenso MX players
Mexican football managers
Footballers from Guadalajara, Jalisco
Association footballers not categorized by position